Bulgaria participated in the Eurovision Song Contest 2017 with the song "Beautiful Mess" written by Borislav Milanov, Sebastian Arman, Joacim Bo Persson, Alex Omar and Alexander V. Blay. The song was performed by Kristian Kostov. On 13 March 2017, the Bulgarian broadcaster Bulgarian National Television (BNT) announced that Kristian Kostov had been selected to compete at the 2017 contest in Kyiv, Ukraine. The song that Kostov competed with, "Beautiful Mess", was also internally selected and was presented to the public on the same day.

Bulgaria was drawn to compete in the second semi-final of the Eurovision Song Contest which took place on 11 May 2017. Performing during the show in position 15, "Beautiful Mess" was announced among the top 10 entries of the second semi-final and therefore qualified to compete in the final on 13 May. It was later revealed that Bulgaria placed first out of the 18 participating countries in the semi-final with 403 points. In the final, Bulgaria performed in position 25 and placed second out of the 26 participating countries, scoring 615 points.

Background 

The nation achieved their best result in the contest in 2016 with the song "If Love Was a Crime" performed by Poli Genova, which placed fourth. To this point, only two Bulgarian entries had managed to have qualified to the Eurovision final; the nation had failed to qualify to the final with their other eight entries.

The Bulgarian national broadcaster, Bulgarian National Television (BNT), broadcasts the event within Bulgaria and organises the selection process for the nation's entry. BNT confirmed Bulgaria's participation in the 2017 Eurovision Song Contest on 29 September 2016. In the past, BNT had alternated between both internal selections and national finals in order to select the Bulgarian entry. In 2016, the broadcaster internally selected the Bulgarian entry for the competition, a selection procedure that continued for their 2017 entry.

Before Eurovision

Internal selection
On 22 December 2016, BNT opened a submission period for producers to submit their proposals until 20 January 2017. Each proposal was required to contain both the artist and song as well as the staging concept of the entry. Artists were required to be Bulgarian citizens and have experience of singing live, while eligible producers were those that have experience in artist management and have produced at least three projects which have had a high level of popularity in the past two years. Songs were required to contain partial Bulgarian involvement. On 27 January 2017, the broadcaster announced that six entries had been shortlisted and evaluated by three focus groups: BNT representatives, music professionals and international representatives.

On 13 March 2017, BNT announced that Kristian Kostov had been selected to represent Bulgaria in Kyiv. His song "Beautiful Mess" was presented through the release of the official lyrics video via the official Eurovision Song Contest's YouTube channel. Kristian Kostov previously participated in the fourth season of X Factor Bulgaria where he was the runner-up. "Beautiful Mess" was written by members of the songwriting team Symphonix International: Borislav Milanov, Sebastian Arman, Joacim Bo Persson, Alex Omar and Alexander V. Blay.

Promotion
Kristian Kostov made several appearances across Europe to specifically promote "Beautiful Mess" as the Bulgarian Eurovision entry. On 2 April, Kostov performed during the London Eurovision Party, which was held at the Café de Paris venue in London, United Kingdom and hosted by Nicki French and Paddy O'Connell. Between 3 and 6 April, Kostov took part in promotional activities in Tel Aviv, Israel where he performed during the Israel Calling event held at the Ha'teatron venue. On 8 April, Kostov performed during the Eurovision in Concert event which was held at the Melkweg venue in Amsterdam, Netherlands and hosted by Cornald Maas and Selma Björnsdóttir. On 15 April, Kostov performed during the Eurovision Spain Pre-Party, which was held at the Sala La Riviera venue in Madrid, Spain.

At Eurovision

According to Eurovision rules, all nations with the exceptions of the host country and the "Big Five" (France, Germany, Italy, Spain and the United Kingdom) are required to qualify from one of two semi-finals in order to compete for the final; the top ten countries from each semi-final progress to the final. The European Broadcasting Union (EBU) split up the competing countries into six different pots based on voting patterns from previous contests, with countries with favourable voting histories put into the same pot. On 31 January 2017, a special allocation draw was held which placed each country into one of the two semi-finals, as well as which half of the show they would perform in. Bulgaria was placed into the second semi-final, to be held on 11 May 2017, and was scheduled to perform in the second half of the show.

Once all the competing songs for the 2017 contest had been released, the running order for the semi-finals was decided by the shows' producers rather than through another draw, so that similar songs were not placed next to each other. Bulgaria was set to perform in position 16, following the entry from Belarus and before the entry from Lithuania. But after Russia was removed from the running order of the competition following their withdrawal from the contest, Bulgaria's position shifted to 15.

The two semi-finals and the final were broadcast in Bulgaria on BNT 1 with commentary by Elena Rosberg and Georgi Kushvaliev. The Bulgarian spokesperson, who announced the top 12-point score awarded by the Bulgarian jury during the final, was Boryana Gramatikova.

Semi-final
Kristian Kostov took part in technical rehearsals on 3 May and 6 May, followed by dress rehearsals on 10 and 11 May. This included the jury show on 10 May where the professional juries of each country watched and voted on the competing entries.

The Bulgarian performance featured Kristian Kostov performing in a black jacket and trousers with a white shirt underneath. The stage colours were black and blue and the LED screens displayed white dynamic lines and shapes that transitioned to a torrential rainstorm effect as the song progressed. The performance also featured holograms that Kostov interacted with. The stage concept for the Bulgarian performance was developed by Swedish artistic director Sacha Jean-Baptiste. Three off-stage backing vocalists joined Kristian Kostov: Borislav Borisov Dimitrov, Cesár Sampson and Vlado Mihailov. Sampson would go on to represent Austria in the Eurovision Song Contest 2018, while Mihailov would go on to represent Bulgaria in the Eurovision Song Contest 2018 as part of the group Equinox.

At the end of the show, Bulgaria was announced as having finished in the top 10 and subsequently qualifying for the grand final. It was later revealed that Bulgaria placed first in the semi-final, receiving a total of 403 points: 204 points from the televoting and 199 points from the juries.

Final

Shortly after the second semi-final, a winners' press conference was held for the ten qualifying countries. As part of this press conference, the qualifying artists took part in a draw to determine which half of the grand final they would subsequently participate in. This draw was done in the reverse order the countries appeared in the semi-final running order. Bulgaria was drawn to compete in the second half. Following this draw, the shows' producers decided upon the running order of the final, as they had done for the semi-finals. Bulgaria was subsequently placed to perform in position 25, following the entry from Sweden and before the entry from France.

Kristian Kostov once again took part in dress rehearsals on 12 and 13 May before the final, including the jury final where the professional juries cast their final votes before the live show. Kristian Kostov performed a repeat of his semi-final performance during the final on 13 May. Bulgaria placed second in the final, scoring 615 points: 337 points from the televoting and 278 points from the juries.

Voting 
Voting during the three shows involved each country awarding two sets of points from 1-8, 10 and 12: one from their professional jury and the other from televoting. Each nation's jury consisted of five music industry professionals who are citizens of the country they represent, with their names published before the contest to ensure transparency. This jury judged each entry based on: vocal capacity; the stage performance; the song's composition and originality; and the overall impression by the act. In addition, no member of a national jury was permitted to be related in any way to any of the competing acts in such a way that they cannot vote impartially and independently. The individual rankings of each jury member as well as the nation's televoting results were released shortly after the grand final.

Below is a breakdown of points awarded to Bulgaria and awarded by Bulgaria in the second semi-final and grand final of the contest, and the breakdown of the jury voting and televoting conducted during the two shows:

Points awarded to Bulgaria

Points awarded by Bulgaria

Detailed voting results
The following members comprised the Bulgarian jury:
 Milka Miteva (jury chairperson)musician, pianist, lecturer at the New Bulgarian University, headmaster of "L. Pipkov" National Musical School
 Orlin Pavlovsinger, actor, represented Bulgaria in the 2005 contest as part of Kaffe
 Maria Grancharovasinger, producer
 Atanas Stoyanovjournalist, radio host and presenter
 Nelly Rangelovapop singer

References

External links 

2017
Countries in the Eurovision Song Contest 2017
Eurovision